Government Canyon, a valley that heads at an elevation of 2483 feet at , and runs southwest to its mouth on  Howard Draw in Crockett County, elevation 2014 feet.

Government Canyon was a place along the route where the San Antonio-El Paso Road left the Head of Devil's River to go northwest, 44 miles across Johnson Draw and Government Canyon to Howard Draw and Howard Spring.

References

Pecos River
Landforms of Crockett County, Texas
San Antonio–El Paso Road